Moravská Třebová is a town in Svitavy District in the Pardubice Region of the Czech Republic. It has about 9,700 inhabitants. The historic town centre is well preserved and is protected by law as an urban monument reservation.

Administrative parts

Moravská Třebová is made up of town parts of Město and Předměstí, and villages of Boršov, Sušice and Udánky.

Geography
It lies mostly in the Podorlická Uplands. The westernmost part of the municipal territory extends into the Svitavy Uplands and includes the Rohová National Nature Reserve.

The town is situated on the Třebůvka River, which feeds the Moravská Třebová Pond on the southern outskirts of the town.

History
Moravská Třebová was founded around 1257 by Boreš of Rýzmburk as a typical colonization town. The greatest boom occurred during the rule of the Lords of Boskovice and Ladislav Velen of Zierotin between 1486 and 1622, when the town was the centre of humanistic scholarship and earned the nickname "Moravian Athens".

In 1840 and 1844, the town was severely damaged by fires, which destroyed part of the castle and Renaissance façades of the houses.

Since its foundation it was part of the Kingdom of Bohemia. In 1469 it passed under Hungarian rule, and in 1490 it returned to Bohemia. From 1804, along with Bohemia, it was ruled by the Austrian Empire, and after the compromise of 1867 it was part of the Austrian portion of Austria-Hungary, within which it was the seat of the district with the same name, one of the 34 Bezirkshauptmannschaften in Moravia. Following World War I, from 1918, it formed part of newly independent Czechoslovakia.

Moravská Třebová was located in the largest German linguistic enclave within Bohemia and Moravia. Until the expulsion of the Germans in 1945 according to the Beneš decrees and Potsdam Agreement, it was mainly inhabited by German-speaking population.

During the German occupation (World War II), the occupiers operated the E391 forced labour subcamp of the Stalag VIII-B/344 prisoner-of-war camp in the town.

The town was largely shaped by the textile industry. However, most factories eventually went bankrupt.

Between 1850 and 1960, Moravská Třebová has been a district town.

Demographics

Sights

The main landmark is the Moravská Třebová Castle. The original castle from the 13th century was reconstructed in the early Renaissance style in the late 15th century. In 1611–1618 it was expanded with an arcade wing. The castle is one of the oldest Renaissance monument in the country.

The historic town centre is formed by the regular rectangular T. G. Masaryka Square and adjacent streets. On the square is the plague column built in 1719–1720. The landmark of the square is the town hall. It is a late Gothic building from around 1520, reconstructed in the Renaissance style around 1560. The square includes series of Gothic and Renaissance burgher houses.

The town fortifications were built in the early 16th century. Nowadays, only fragments of the walls and three bastions are preserved.

The Church of the Assumption of the Virgin Mary was a Gothic building from the 13th century. It was reconstructed in the Baroque style after the fire in 1726. it was a cemetery church until 1500, when the cemetery was relocated to the newly built Church of the Exaltation of the Holy Cross on the Křížový vrch Hill.

Notable people
Carl Giskra (1820–1879), Austrian politician
Walther Hensel (1887–1956), music researcher
Magda B. Arnold (1903–2002), psychologist
Friedrich Lang (1915–2003), Luftwaffe pilot
Gert Wilden (1917–2015), composer and conductor
Jaroslava Maxová (born 1957), opera singer and vocal coach
Marcel Kolaja (born 1980), politician
Roman Kreuziger (born 1986), road cyclist
Leopold König (born 1987), road cyclist

Twin towns – sister cities

Moravská Třebová is twinned with:
 Banská Štiavnica, Slovakia
 Staufenberg, Germany
 Vlaardingen, Netherlands

References

External links

Cities and towns in the Czech Republic
Populated places in Svitavy District
Populated places established in the 1250s